The 2022 Charlotte FC season was the club's first season in Major League Soccer, the top division of soccer in the United States. The team was coached by Miguel Ángel Ramírez until he was fired on May 31. Assistant coach Christian Lattanzio was promoted to interim head coach.

Due to the 2022 FIFA World Cup, the season began on February 26, 2022 and concluded in October.

Team information

Squad information

Appearances and goals are career totals from all-competitions as of October 9, 2022.

Roster transactions

In

Out

SuperDraft picks

Expansion Draft picks

Competitions

Exhibitions

Major League Soccer season

Eastern Conference

Overall

Results summary 

Updated to match(es) played on October 9, 2022.

Matches

U.S. Open Cup 

Charlotte FC made their Open Cup debut in the Third Round.

Statistics

Appearances and Goals 
Numbers after plus-sign(+) denote appearances as a substitute.

|-
! colspan="18" style=background:#dcdcdc; text-align:center| Goalkeepers 

|-
! colspan="18" style=background:#dcdcdc; text-align:center| Defenders 

|-
! colspan="18" style=background:#dcdcdc; text-align:center| Midfielders

|-
! colspan="18" style=background:#dcdcdc; text-align:center| Forwards 

|-
! colspan="18" style=background:#dcdcdc; text-align:center| Left after start of season

Goalscorers
{| class="wikitable" style="text-align:center"
|-
!width=15|
!width=15|
!width=15|
!width=15|
!width=175|Name
!width=80|MLS
!width=100|U.S. Open Cup
!width=80|Total
|-
!1
|11
|FW
|
|Karol Świderski
|10
|0
!10
|-
!2
|12
|FW
|
|Daniel Ríos
|7
|2
!9
|-
!3
|16
|FW
|
|Andre Shinyashiki
|6
|1
!7
|-
!4
|26
|FW
|
|Yordy Reyna
|3
|1
!4
|-
!rowspan="3"|5
|15
|MF
|
|Ben Bender
|3
|0
!3
|-
|22
|DF
|
|Christian Fuchs
|3
|0
!3
|-
|17
|FW
|
|McKinze Gaines
|1
|2
!3
|-
!8
|10
|FW
|
|Christian Ortiz
|1
|1
!2
|-
!rowspan="9"|9
|25
|DF
|
|Harrison Afful
|0
|1
!1
|-
|8
|MF
|
|Jordy Alcívar
|1
|0
!1
|-
|3
|DF
|
|Adam Armour
|1
|0
!1
|-
|13
|MF
|
|Brandt Bronico
|1
|0
!1
|-
|4
|DF
|
|Guzmán Corujo
|1
|0
!1
|-
|20
|MF
|
|Derrick Jones
|1
|0
!1
|-
|25
|MF
|
|Quinn McNeill
|1
|0
!1
|-
|6
|FW
|
|Sergio Ruiz
|1
|0
!1
|-
|6
|MF
|
|Nuno Santos
|1
|0
!1
|-
| colspan="5" |Own Goals
|2
|0
!2
|-
! colspan="5" |Totals
!44
!8
!52

Assists 
{| class="wikitable" style="text-align:center"
|-
!width=15|
!width=15|
!width=15|
!width=15|
!width=175|Name
!width=80|MLS
!width=100|U.S. Open Cup
!width=80|Total
|-
!rowspan="3"|1
|15
|MF
|
|Ben Bender
|6
|0
!6
|-
|26
|FW
|
|Yordy Reyna
|3
|3
!6
|-
|11
|FW
|
|Karol Świderski
|6
|0
!6
|-
!rowspan="2"|4
|17
|FW
|
|McKinze Gaines
|4
|0
!4
|-
|7
|MF
|
|Kamil Jóźwiak
|3
|1
!4
|-
!rowspan="3"|6
|13
|MF
|
|Brandt Bronico
|3
|0
!3
|-
|10
|FW
|
|Christian Ortiz
|2
|1
!3
|-
|6
|MF
|
|Sergio Ruiz
|3
|0
!3
|-
!rowspan="3"|9
|24
|DF
|
|Jaylin Lindsey
|2
|0
!2
|-
|35
|MF
|
|Quinn McNeill
|2
|0
!2
|-
|12
|FW
|
|Daniel Ríos
|2
|0
!2
|-
!rowspan="8"|12
|8
|MF
|
|Jordy Alcívar
|1
|0
!1
|-
|21
|MF
|
|Alan Franco
|1
|0
!1
|-
|22
|DF
|
|Christian Fuchs
|1
|0
!1
|-
|21
|DF
|
|Adilson Malanda
|1
|0
!1
|-
|36
|DF
|
|Koa Santos
|1
|0
!1
|-
|6
|MF
|
|Nuno Santos
|1
|0
!1
|-
|16
|FW
|
|Andre Shinyashiki
|0
|1
!1
|-
|18
|FW
|
|Kerwin Vargas
|1
|0
!1
|-
!colspan="5"|Totals
!43
!6
!49

Disciplinary record

References

Charlotte FC
Charlotte FC
Charlotte FC
Charlotte FC